The Iron Wolf Bridge is a bridge over the Neris River in Vilnius, Lithuania. Named after the legend of Iron Wolf, the bridge connects Naujamiestis with the districts of Žvėrynas and Šnipiškės, as the roundabout  is situated at the administrative line.

Operation 
The bridge has four lanes for each way and is the widest bridge in Vilnius. It one of the busiest and most important transport arteries in Vilnius, leading to the A1 highway in the south and A2 as well as A14 highways in the north. The bridge is located close to the Parliament of Lithuania.

History 
The bridge was constructed in 1979 and is made of reinforced concrete. 

In February 2022, in protest to the 2022 Russian invasion of Ukraine, Lithuanian graffiti artists produced a painting on the bridge featuring the "Russian warship, go fuck yourself" slogan.

References 

Bridges in Vilnius
Road bridges in Lithuania
Bridges completed in 1979